The 2004 Crown Prince Cup was the 29th season of the Saudi premier knockout tournament since its establishment in 1957. It started on 26 February 2004 and concluded with the final on 26 March 2004.

Al-Hilal were the defending champions, but were eliminated in the semi-finals by Al-Ahli.

Al-Ittihad won their record-extending seventh title following a 1–0 win over derby rivals Al-Ahli in the final.

The winners of the competition would have earned a place in the group stage of the 2005 AFC Champions League. However, since Al-Ittihad went on to win the 2004 AFC Champions League, they qualified for the 2005 AFC Champions League as the titleholders. Since Al-Ittihad also finished runners-up in the league, Al-Ahli, the cup runners-up, took this Champions League spot.

Bracket

Source: Al Jazirah

Round of 16
The Round of 16 fixtures were played on 26, 27, 28 and 29 February 2004. All times are local, AST (UTC+3).

Quarter-finals
The Quarter-finals fixtures were played on 4 and 5 March 2004. All times are local, AST (UTC+3).

Semi-finals
The Semi-finals first legs were played on 7 and 8 March 2004 while the second legs were played on 11 and 12 March 2006. All times are local, AST (UTC+3).

|}

Matches

Al-Ittihad won 5–2 on aggregate.

Al-Ahli won 2–1 on aggregate.

Final
The 2004 Crown Prince Cup Final was played on 26 March 2004 at the King Fahd International Stadium in Riyadh between derby rivals Al-Ahli and Al-Ittihad. This was the fifth Crown Prince Cup final to be held at the stadium. Previously, the two sides met twice in the final, Al-Ahli won in 2002 while Al-Ittihad won in 1958. All times are local, AST (UTC+3).

Top goalscorers

See also
 2003–04 Saudi Premier League
 2005 AFC Champions League

References

Saudi Crown Prince Cup seasons
2004 domestic association football cups
Crown Prince Cup